In 1929 Charles Francis Potter founded the First Humanist Society of New York whose advisory board included Julian Huxley, John Dewey, Albert Einstein, and Thomas Mann. Potter was a minister from the Unitarian tradition and in 1930 he and his wife, Clara Cook Potter, published Humanism: A New Religion. Throughout the 1930s Potter was a well-known advocate of women's rights, access to birth control, "civil divorce laws", and an end to capital punishment.

See also
Religious Humanism
Fellowship of Humanity

References

External links
Charles Francis Potter

Humanist associations